"Lavender's Blue" (also called "Lavender Blue") is an English folk song and nursery rhyme from the 17th century. Its Roud Folk Song Index number is 3483. It has been recorded in various forms and some pop versions have been hits in the U.S. and U.K. charts.

Lyrics
There are as many as thirty verses to the song, and many variations of each verse. A typical version, described by James Halliwell in 1849, is:
Lavender's blue, dilly dilly, lavender's green,
When I am king, dilly dilly, you shall be queen:
Who told you so, dilly dilly, who told you so?
'Twas mine own heart, dilly dilly, that told me so.

Call up your men, dilly dilly, set them to work,
Some with a rake, dilly dilly, some with a fork;
Some to make hay, dilly dilly, some to thresh corn,
Whilst you and I, dilly dilly, keep ourselves warm.

If you should die, dilly dilly, as it may hap,
You shall be buried, dilly dilly, under the tap;
Who told you so, dilly dilly, pray tell me why?
That you might drink, dilly dilly, when you are dry.

Origins

The earliest surviving version of the song is in a broadside printed in England between 1672 and 1679, under the name Diddle Diddle, Or The Kind Country Lovers. The broadside indicates it is to be sung to the tune of "Lavender Green", implying that a tune by that name was already in existence. The lyrics printed in the broadside are fairly bawdy, celebrating sex and drinking.

According to Robert B. Waltz, "The singer tells his lady that she must love him because he loves her. He tells of a vale where young man and maid have lain together, and suggests that they might do the same". Waltz cites Sandra Stahl Dolby as describing this broadside version as being about a girl named Nell keeping the singer's bed warm.

Here is the first of ten verses:
Lavender's green, diddle, diddle,
Lavender's blue
You must love me, diddle, diddle,
cause I love you,
I heard one say, diddle, diddle,
since I came hither,
That you and I, diddle, diddle,
must lie together.

Both Waltz (citing Eloise Hubbard Linscott) and Halliwell have noted the song's association with Twelfth Night and the choosing of the king and queen of the festivities of that holiday.

"Lavender's Blue" emerged as a children's song in Songs for the Nursery in 1805 in the form:
Lavender blue and Rosemary green,
When I am king you shall be queen;
Call up my maids at four o'clock,
Some to the wheel and some to the rock;
Some to make hay and some to shear corn,
And you and I will keep the bed warm.

Similar versions appeared in collections of rhymes throughout the 19th century.

Revival

1949
A version of the song, titled "Lavender Blue (Dilly Dilly)", was featured in the 1948 Walt Disney film So Dear to My Heart, where it was sung by Burl Ives. This version was nominated for Academy Award for Best Original Song in 1949. This version of the song was credited to Eliot Daniel (music) and Larry Morey (lyrics). "Lavender Blue" was one of 400 nominees for the American Film Institute's "100 Years... 100 Songs" list of the 100 greatest film songs, which was presented on a television program of that name which aired on June 22, 2004, but it didn't make the final list. The appearance of "Lavender Blue" in the Disney film sparked a revival of interest in the song.

Ives' version of "Lavender Blue" was recorded in December 1948 and released as a single in January 1949. As was common for pop songs in those days, several other singers released versions at near the same time. Sammy Kaye also released a version in 1949, which charted at No. 5, as did Dinah Shore (her version went to No. 1 on the Australian chart and was the title track of her album Lavender Blue). Vera Lynn's version of "Lavender Blue" was issued on the B side of her single "Again", which reached the Billboard magazine Best Seller chart on January 21, 1949.

Later 20th century
A decade later, in 1959, Sammy Turner released a rhythm and blues version produced by Jerry Leiber and Mike Stoller which reached #3 on the Billboard Hot 100.

"Lavender's Blue" continued to be recorded by pop artists throughout the rest of the 20th century. Jazz pianist Jack Pleis recorded Lavender's Blue for his 1955 album Music from Disneyland. Tommy Bruce made a single of it in 1963, and The Fleetwoods recorded a version in 1965. In 1975, the song was interpreted by Leon Russell and Mary Russell for their Wedding Album, and the next year the British early music revival group The City Waites recorded the original 17th-century bawdy broadside version of "Lavender's Green, Lavender's Blue" on their album Pills to Purge Melancholy. In 1988, Broadway singer Barbara Cook recorded a version for her release The Disney Album. In 1991, The Wiggles included this song on their albums The Wiggles and Pop Go The Wiggles.

Other 20th-century works have incorporated the song or parts of it, or used it as a motif or base for a title. Benjamin Britten wrote Lavender's Blue into his 1954 opera The Turn of The Screw, where it is sung by the two children, Miles and Flora, and in Brad Fraser's 1989 play Unidentified Human Remains and the True Nature of Love, lyrics from the song are repeatedly sung by the character Benita. And the song was a prominent motif in M.M. Kaye's 1980 children's novel The Ordinary Princess.

In 1985, the British rock band Marillion included a song called "Lavender" on their album Misplaced Childhood. The song had lyrics derived from "Lavender's Blue" and became a number 5 hit on the UK singles chart.

Andre Norton's 1975 novel, Lavender-Green Magic and Kathleen Lines' and Harold Jones's 1954 collection of nursery rhymes and songs Lavender's Blue took their titles from the song, as did several other books.

21st century
In the 21st century, 2015, Disney revived "Lavender's Blue" as a signature song for another film, Cinderella and
Reinhard Mey recorded another version for his 2016 album Mr. Lee.

Notes

References

External links

17th-century songs
English folk songs
English nursery rhymes
Burl Ives songs
Dinah Shore songs
The Fleetwoods songs
Disney songs
Number-one singles in Australia
Year of song unknown
Songwriter unknown
English children's songs
Traditional children's songs